Dolichoderus lacinius is an extinct species of Miocene ant in the genus Dolichoderus. Described by Zhang in 1989, fossils of a queen specimen were found in China.

References

†
Miocene insects
Fossil taxa described in 1989
†
Fossil ant taxa